Ulpiano Amistoso Babol (9 April 1936 – 12 September 1973) was a Filipino swimmer. He competed in two events at the 1956 Summer Olympics.

References

1936 births
1973 deaths
Filipino male swimmers
Olympic swimmers of the Philippines
Swimmers at the 1956 Summer Olympics
Asian Games medalists in swimming
Asian Games silver medalists for the Philippines
Swimmers at the 1958 Asian Games
Medalists at the 1958 Asian Games
20th-century Filipino people